Notes from the Underground or Notes from Underground may refer to:

Literature 
 Notes from Underground, an 1864 novel by Fyodor Dostoyevsky
 Notes from the Underground (creative writing paper), a free daily paper in London launched in 2007
 Notes from Underground (Scruton novel), a 2014 novel by Roger Scruton
 Notes from the Underground, an underground newspaper in Dallas, Texas, later renamed Dallas Notes

Music 
 Notes from Underground (1997 album), a 2009 album by American band 1997
 Notes from the Underground (Medeski Martin & Wood album), 1992
 Notes from the Underground (Hollywood Undead album), 2013
 Notes from the Underground, a 2001 album by Clan of Xymox
 Notes from the Underground, a 2008 album by Elliott Murphy
 "Notes from the Underground", a song from Sarah Slean's 2008 album The Baroness
 Notes from the Underground, a 2020 album by High Contrast

Other uses 
 "Notes from the Underground", 1967 alternative radio program hosted by author Tom Robbins on KRAB-FM, in Seattle
 “Notes from the Underground” a three-part episode story arc of the 2003 Teenage Mutant Ninja Turtles series

See also
 Notes from Thee Underground, a 1994 album by Pigface